was a village located in Kanoashi District, Shimane Prefecture, Japan.

As of 2003, the village had an estimated population of 1,789 and a density of 12.99 persons per km². The total area was 137.72 km².

On October 1, 2005, Kakinoki, along with the village of Muikaichi (also from Kanoashi District), were merged to create the town of Yoshika.

External links
 The official website for Kakinoki

Dissolved municipalities of Shimane Prefecture